Mutluca can refer to:

 Mutluca, Hazro
 Mutluca, Hınıs
 Mutluca, Karpuzlu